Carswell is a surname of Scottish origin.

People with the surname 

Allan Carswell (b. 1933), Canadian physicist
 Catherine Carswell (1879–1946), Scottish novelist, biographer and journalist 
 Donald Carswell (1882–1940), Scottish barrister, journalist and author
 Douglas Carswell (born 1971), British politician
 Dwayne Carswell (born 1972), American football player
 Frank Carswell (1919–1998), American baseball player
 G. Harrold Carswell (1919–1992), American judge
 Gary Carswell (1968–2015), Manx motorcycle racer
 Horace S. Carswell Jr. (1916–1944), American Medal of Honor recipient
 James Carswell (1830–1897), a Scottish railway engineer and architect
 John Patrick Carswell, or, J. P. Carswell (1918-1997), English civil servant and author
Robert Carswell (disambiguation), several people
 Séon Carsuel (John Carswell) (1522–1572), Scottish clergyman and reformer
 Stuart Carswell (born 1993), Scottish football player
 Timothy "Tim" Christopher Carswell (b. 1971), New Zealand two-time bronze medalist racing cyclist at the 1998 Commonwealth Games
 Wilson Carswell (born 1937), Scottish physician
William B. Carswell (1883–1953), Scottish-born New York lawyer, judge and politician

Fictional characters 

 Casey Carswell, from the British soap opera Coronation Street

See also 

 Carswell crater, exposed impact crater in Saskatchewan, Canada
 Carswell (publisher)
 Naval Air Station Joint Reserve Base Fort Worth, formerly known as Carswell Air Force Base, Texas
Federal Medical Center, Carswell, a federal prison at the base

Surnames of Scottish origin